Five Points, Tennessee may refer to the following places in Tennessee:
Five Points, Giles County, Tennessee
Five Points, Lawrence County, Tennessee
Five Points, Madison County, Tennessee
Five Points, Rhea County, Tennessee